Gold: Greatest Hits may refer to:

Gold: Greatest Hits (ABBA album), an album by ABBA
Gold: Greatest Hits (Steps album), an album by Steps
Gold: Greatest Hits (video), a video by The Carpenters

See also
Gold – 20 Super Hits, an album by Boney M
Gold: Their Great Hits, an album by Steppenwolf